Daniel Stone Plank House was a historic home located near Henderson, Vance County, North Carolina.  It dated to the late-18th or early-19th century, and was a two-story, sawn plank farm house.  It was built and altered in
at least three periods, and measured 22 feet long by 23 feet deep.  It was moved to its listing site about 1885, and featured a gable
roof projecting over the vertical plane of the walls on all four elevations. It has been demolished.

It was listed on the National Register of Historic Places in 1984.

References

Houses on the National Register of Historic Places in North Carolina
Houses completed in 1885
Houses in Vance County, North Carolina
National Register of Historic Places in Vance County, North Carolina